The 2013 Medicine Hat Charity Classic was held from October 18 to 21 at the Medicine Hat Curling Club in Medicine Hat, Alberta as part of the 2013–14 World Curling Tour. Both the men's and women's events were held in a triple-knockout format. The purse for the men's event was CAD$34,000, of which the winner received CAD$10,000, while the purse for the women's event was CAD$30,000, of which the winner received CAD$8,000.

It was an all-Saskatchewan final on the men's side with two teams from Regina against each other, with Randy Bryden defeating Scott Bitz. On the women's side, it was an international affair with Russia's Anna Sidorova defeating Japan's Sayaka Yoshimura.

Men

Teams
The teams are listed as follows:

Playoffs

Women

Teams
The teams are listed as follows:

Playoffs

References

External links

2013 in Canadian curling
Sport in Medicine Hat
Curling in Alberta